Toril y Masegoso is a municipality located in the province of Teruel, Aragon, Spain. According to the 2004 census (INE), the municipality had a population of 31 inhabitants. As of 2011, Toril y Masegoso's mayor was Javier Dalda Borja.

References

Municipalities in the Province of Teruel